Ramapur or Rama Pur as it is known for postal purposes, is a village-gram panchayat in Pawai Block, Phulpur, Azamgarh, Uttar Pradesh, India

References

Villages in Azamgarh district